A list of Romanian Orthodox monasteries, predominantly located in present-day Romania.

Argeș County
Curtea de Argeș Monastery

Negru Vodă Monastery
Trivale Monastery

Bucharest

Antim Monastery
Cașin Monastery
Christiana Monastery
Mihai Vodă Monastery
Radu Vodă Monastery
Stavropoleos Monastery

Dâmbovița County
 Bâldana Monastery
 Bunea Monastery
 Cobia Monastery
 Dealu Monastery
 Doicești Monastery
 Nucet Monastery
 Pătroaia Deal Monastery
 Peștera Ialomicioarei Monastery
 Săcuieni Monastery
 Stelea Monastery
 Viforâta Monastery

Ilfov County
Căldăruşani Monastery
Cernica Monastery
Pasărea Monastery
Sămurcășești Monastery
Sitaru Monastery
Snagov Monastery

Neamț County
Agapia Monastery
Văratec Monastery
Neamț Monastery

Suceava County
Bogdana Monastery
Dragomirna
Humor Monastery
Moldovița Monastery
Putna Monastery
Sucevița Monastery
Voroneț Monastery

Unsorted

 Adam Monastery
 Afteia Monastery
 Agafton Monastery
 Aninoasa Monastery
 Arbore Monastery
 Arnota Monastery
 Baia de Aramă Monastery
 Bănceni Monastery
 Bârnova Monastery
 Bârsana Monastery
 Bistrița Monastery
 Bixad Monastery
 Brâncoveni Monastery
 Brebu Monastery
 Bujoreni Monastery
 Cǎlugǎra Monastery
 Caraiman Monastery
 Celic Dere Monastery
 Cetățuia Monastery
 Cheia Monastery
 Ciolanu Monastery
 Clocociov Monastery
 Cocoș Monastery
 Comana Monastery
 Coșlogeni Monastery
 Cozia Monastery
 Crasna Monastery
 Curtea de Argeș Monastery
 Dălhauți Monastery
 Dealu Mare Monastery
 Dervent Monastery
 Diaconesti Monastery
 Dintr-un Lemn Monastery
 Dobrovăț Monastery
 Dumbrava Monastery
 Duminica Sfintilor Romani Monastery
 Edenu Monastery
 Frăsinei Monastery
 Frumoasa Monastery
 Galata Monastery
 Ghighiu Monastery
 Giurgeni Monastery
 Glavacioc Monastery
 Golia Monastery
 Govora Monastery
 Hadâmbu Monastery
 Hagigadar Monastery
 Halmyris Monastery
 Hodoș Bodrog Monastery
 Horaița Monastery
 Horezu Monastery
 Izbuc Monastery
 Jercălăi Monastery (a.k.a. Schitul Sfânta Maria-Cricov)
 Lainici Monastery
 Moisei Monastery
 Negru Voda Monastery
 Nera Monastery
 Nicula Monastery
 Oașa Monastery
 Pângarați Monastery
 Petru Vodă Monastery
 Piatra Scrisă Monastery
 Pissiota Monastery
 Plăviceni Monastery
 Plumbuita Monastery
 Poiana Mărului Monastery
 Polovragi Monastery
 Ponor Monastery
 Predeal Monastery
 Prislop Monastery
 Probota Monastery
 Prodromos (Mount Athos) (Ecumenical Patriarchate of Constantinople)
 Râmeț Monastery
 Rarău Monastery
 Râșca Monastery
 Rătești Monastery
 Recea Monastery
 Robaia Monastery
 Rohia Monastery
 Sădinca Monastery
 Sâmbăta de Sus Monastery
 Saon Monastery
 Săraca Monastery
 Secu Monastery
 Sfânta Treime Monastery
 Sihăstria Monastery
 Sihla Monastery
 Sinaia Monastery
 Slătioara Monastery
 Stânișoara Monastery
 Strâmba Monastery
 Surpatele Monastery
 Suzana Monastery
 Tanacu Monastery
 Tismana Monastery
 Trei Ierarhi Monastery
 Turnu Monastery
 Tutana Monastery
 Valea Mănăstirii Monastery
 Văratec Monastery
 Vărzărești Monastery
 Viforâta Monastery
 Vişina Monastery
 Vlădiceni Monastery
 Vladimiresti Monastery
 Zamfira Monastery
 Zosin Monastery

See also
Romanian Orthodox monasteries

External links

Monastaries
Monastaries
Monastery
Romanian orthodox